The 2014–15 PFF National Men's Club Championship (also known as 2014–15 PFF–Smart National Club Championship) was the 4th season of the PFF National Men's Club Championship, a Filipino association football competition organized by the Philippine Football Federation.

Ceres were the defending champions, retaining the title for the second time after beating Global, 3-1 on aggregate in a two-leg finals in December 2013.

On 31 January 2015, Loyola Meralco Sparks defeated Global with a scoreline of 2 - 0 to win the title. The cup winners, Loyola Meralco Sparks are guaranteed a place in the 2016 AFC Cup Play-off.

Competition format
Clubs in each Cluster will play a single round robin. The competition format at the Cluster Qualifier Stage will be followed regardless of the number of clubs for each Cluster. The winner in each Cluster and the best second-place club from cluster 1, 2, 3 and 4 in Mindanao and the best 2nd placed club from cluster 6, 7 and 8 in Luzon will be slotted in five groups (Group A, B, C, D, and E) during the Group Qualifiers stage.

Since Negros Oriental Football Association did not participate in the competition, there will be a vacancy in Group C, where it will be filled up by the best ranked 3rd placer in all Clusters (Clusters l-8). The winner in each of the five groups will advance to the National group stage which would include the top three UFL clubs.
 
The resulting eight clubs will be drawn into two groups (Group A and Group B). The clubs in each group (Group A and Group B) will play single round robin elimination, where top two clubs in each group will advance to the National Semi-Finals. The top two clubs in each group (Group A and Group B) will play in a cross-over format and the loser in Semi-Finals matches will play for 3rd and 4th place.

Winners in semi-final matches will play for the national championship.

Regional qualifiers
The provincial eliminations for the tournament started last April 2014. Clusters from Luzon, Visayas and Mindanao regions underwent qualifiers to be able to advance to the regional group stage in August 2014.

National Capital Region Cluster
Cluster 5: Top three  teams under National Capital Region Football Association gain direct entry to the group stage. Global FC and Stallion FC, although playing in National Capital Region Football Association's United Football League, underwent regional qualifications in their respective Provincial Football Associations (PFA) - Leyte Football Association and Iloilo Football Association respectively.

Top three clubs from the United Football League earned a spot in the National Capital Region Football Association cluster. National Capital Region eliminations were held from August 22–24, 2014. Qualified clubs are as follows:

Loyola Meralco Sparks FC
Kaya FC
Global FC

Luzon Cluster
Cluster 6: North Luzon eliminations were held on August 23, 2014 in Montalban, Rizal. 
Flame United - Cherifer FC represented Cavite Football Association after winning the local qualifiers on May 23, 2014.
Mendiola United FC represented Rizal Football Association.
Matches

Mendiola United FC won the qualifiers.

Cluster 7: Central Luzon eliminations were held from August 27–29, 2014 at UP Los Baños, Laguna.
Adriatico FC represented Oriental Mindoro FA.
Representative from Quezon FA
Schwarz F.C. represented Laguna Football Association.

Cluster 8: South Luzon eliminations were held from August 29–31, 2014 in Daet, Camarines Norte.
Representative from Legazpi City - Albay Football Association
Tribu FC represented Camarines Norte Football Association.
ABC Stars FC represented Naga City- Camarines Sur Football Association.
Tribu FC won the qualifiers.

Visayas Cluster
West Visayas cluster
Stallion FC represented Iloilo Football Association.
Ceres-La Salle FC represented Negros Occidental Football Association by thrashing FC Bacolod, 7-0, in qualifiers.

East-central Visayas cluster
Laos FC represented Leyte Football Association.
ERCO-BRO Nationals represented Cebu Football Association.

Mindanao Cluster
Cluster 1: West Mindanao eliminations were held on August 22–24, 2014, in Dapitan, Zamboanga del Norte.
Versache FC represented Misamis Occidental - Ozamis Football Association.
Zamboanga Hermosa FC represented Zamboanga City Football Association.
DMC FC represented Zamboanga del Norte - Dipolog Football Association after defeating Dipolog United FC in the finals.
Saints FC represented Zamboanga del Sur - Pagadian Football Association.
Matches

DMC FC won the qualifiers.

Cluster 2: North Mindanao eliminations were held from August 22–24, 2014 in Valencia, Bukidnon.
Manolo Fortich FC represented Bukidnon Football Association.
Ampayon FC represented Butuan-Agusan del Norte Football Association after defeating DSC FC, 3-1, in the local elimination finals.
Magis FC represented Cagayan de Oro - Misamis Oriental Football Association.
FC 95 represented Iligan - Lanao del Norte Football Association.

All times are Philippine Standard Time (PST) – UTC+8.

Matches

Cluster 3: Central Mindanao eliminations were held from August 29–31, 2014 in Koronadal City, South Cotabato.
Sultan FC represented Maguindanao - Cotabato City Football Association
M'lang FC represented North Cotabato Football Association
Waterking FC represented Sultan Kudarat Football Association
Real Marbel FC represented Football Association of South Cotabato

All times are Philippine Standard Time (PST) – UTC+8.

Matches

Cluster 4: East Mindanao eliminations were held from August 29–31, 2014 in Tagum City, Davao del Norte.
UM Tagum FC represented Davao del Norte Football Association after winning the local qualifiers held from April 20 to May 25, 2014.
Tandag FC represented Agusan del Sur Football Association.
Hooligans FC represented Davao Football Association.
Montevista FC represented Compostela Valley Football Association.

All times are Philippine Standard Time (PST) – UTC+8.

Matches

Group stage
Clubs that advanced from the respective cluster eliminations are as follows:

Group A matches were held at North Football Field in Bacolod from September 26–28, 2014. 
Ceres - La Salle FC - Qualified direct from Visayas Cluster (Negros Occidental FA).
DMC FC - Winner of Cluster 1 (West Mindanao).
Mendiola United FC - Winner of Cluster 6 (North Luzon).

All times are Philippine Standard Time (PST) – UTC+8.

Matches

Group B matches were held at Central Philippine University Football Field in Iloilo City and Barotac Football Plaza in Barotac Nuevo from September 26–28, 2014.
Stallion FC - Qualified direct from Visayas cluster (Iloilo FA).
Del Monte FC - Winner of Cluster 2 (North Mindanao).
Adriatico FC - Winner of Cluster 7 (Central Luzon).

All times are Philippine Standard Time (PST) – UTC+8.

Matches

Group C matches were held at PFF Regional Center in Valencia City, Bukidnon from September 26–28, 2014.
Zamboanga Hermosa FC - 2nd Best-Ranked Club of Cluster 1. They replaced the representative of Negros Oriental Football Association.
M'lang FC - Winner of Cluster 3 (South-Central Mindanao).
Tribu FC - Winner of Cluster 8 (South Luzon).
Group D matches were held at Abellana Sports Complex, Cebu City from October 1–3, 2014.
ERCO-BRO Nationals - Qualified direct from Visayas cluster (Cebu FA).
UM-Tagum FC - Winner of Cluster 4 (East Mindanao).
Real Marbel FC - 2nd Best-Ranked Club from Cluster 3.

All times are Philippine Standard Time (PST) – UTC+8.

Matches

Group E 
Laos FC - Qualified direct from Visayas cluster (Leyte FA).
Magis FC - 2nd Best-Ranked Club from Cluster 2. They replaced the representative of NCR Football Association.
ABC Stars FC - 2nd Best-Ranked Club from Cluster 8.

All times are Philippine Standard Time (PST) – UTC+8.

Matches

Final phase
Teams qualified for the National Group stage of PFF Smart Championship are the following:

Ceres, winner of Group A.
Stallion, winner of Group B.
M'lang FC, winner of Group C.
ERCO-BRO Nationals, winner of Group D.
Laos, winner of Group E.
Global, qualified via United Football League eliminations.
Loyola Meralco Sparks, qualified via United Football League eliminations.
Kaya, qualified via United Football League eliminations.

Group stage

Group A

Group B

Knockout stage

Semi-finals

Battle for Third

Final

Top Goalscorers

Awards

References

PFF National Men's Club Championship seasons
2015 in Philippine football
2014 in Philippine football